The James Daniel Derby House is a historic house in Glendale, California, U.S.. It was built in 1926 for James Daniel Derby. It was designed in the American Modernistic architectural style with Mayan features by Lloyd Wright. It has been listed on the National Register of Historic Places since December 14, 1978.

See also
 Glendale Register of Historic Resources and Historic Districts

References

Houses on the National Register of Historic Places in California
Houses completed in 1926
Houses in Los Angeles County, California